The name Dindo has been used in the Philippines five times by PAGASA in the Western Pacific.
 Typhoon Nida (2004) (T0402, 04W, Dindo) - a May storm that reached Category 5 intensity and approached the Bicol Region.
 Severe Tropical Storm Matmo (2008) (T0803, 04W, Dindo)
 Tropical Storm Doksuri (2012) (T1206, 07W, Dindo)
 Typhoon Lionrock (2016) (T1610, 12W, Dindo) - an erratic system that did many twists and turns in the open sea before hitting mainland Japan. 
 Typhoon Hagupit (2020) (T2004, 03W, Dindo) - a storm that formed off the coast of Luzon in early August, and hit the People’s Republic of China.

Pacific typhoon set index articles